In 2005, there were 26 This American Life episodes.

Show description: On the experiences of United States National Guard reservists and Marines in post-invasion Iraq
Act 1: When Weekend Warriors Work on Weekdays – Ira Glass
Act 2: Marine Life – Jack Hitt

Show description: On personal struggles leading to unexpected success or failure
Act 1: Take My Break, Please – David Segal
Act 2: What Happens in Baghdad, Stays in Baghdad – Jen Banbury
Act 3: Oedipus Hex – Shalom Auslander

Show description: An entire episode of a story about the wrongful murder conviction of Collin Warner. After 21 years in prison, Warner's friends managed to prove Warner's innocence and free him from jail.
Act 1: Untitled – Anya Bourg
Act 2: The story of Collin Warner continues

Act 1: Thinking inside the box – David Wilcox
Act 2: Where's Walter? – Starlee Kine
Act 3: Giving up the ghosts – Shalom Auslander

Act 1: The Karachi kid
Act 2: Not far from the tree – Amy O'Leary
Act 3: Because I'm the mommy, that's why

Act 1: The Minister Meets the Martyr
Act 2: I Am Curious, Jello – David Segal
Act 3: Eight Percent of Nothing – Etgar Keret

Act 1: Untitled – Ira Glass
Act 2: The Spy Who Loved Everyone – Jorge Just
Act 3: Invisible Girl – Scott Carrier

Act 1: Working Class Hero Sandwich – Shirleen Holt
Act 2: Don't Drive Like My Brother – Jonathan Menjivar
Act 3: Confessions of a Not-So-Dangerous Mind – Brian Montopoli

Act 1: Froggy Goes A-Courtin – Gabrielle Galanek
Act 2: Cat Got Your Tongue – David Sedaris
Act 3: Romance Languages – Ben Karlin

Act 1: Make Him Say Uncle – Ira Glass
Act 2: My Favorite Martian – Paul Tough

Act 1: The Substance of Things Hoped For
Act 2: God Said, Huh? – Julia Sweeney

Act 1: Not Your Parents' Parent Trap – Nazanin Rafsanjani
Act 2: If By Chance We Meet Again – Ira Glass 
Act 3: French Kiss – Sarah Vowell

Prologue – Ira Glass on the Lackawanna 6
Act 1: Petra Bartosiewicz on the arrest and conviction of Hemant Lakhani
Act 2: continuation of Act 1

Prologue: Ira Glass and Nancy Updike
Act 1: Small Thoughts in Big Brains – Alex Blumberg
Act 2: And Daddy Makes Three – Dan Savage
Act 3: Sucker MC-Square – Robert Andrew Powell
Act 4: The Art of Adult Conversation – Alexa Junge

Act 1: Dewey Decibel System – Alex Blumberg
Act 2: Goldstein on Goldstein – Jonathan Goldstein
Act 3: Hearth Shaped Box – Julie Hill

Act 1: The Double Whammy – Ira Glass
Act 2: Small Fish, Smaller Pond – Nick Hornby

Show description: Stories from survivors of Hurricane Katrina.
Prologue: Ira Glass interviews William Nichelson about the role of state and federal authorities
Act 1: Middle of Somewhere – Ira Glass interviews Denise Moore, a hurricane survivor
Music interlude: Memphis Minnie, When the Levee Breaks
Act 2: Forgotten, But Not Lost – Alex Blumberg interviews Lorrie Beth Slonsky and Debbie Zelinsky about an occurrence at the Pontchartrain Expressway bridge
Music interlude: Fats Domino, Walking to New Orleans
Act 3: Social Studies Lesson – Alex Blumberg interviews Ashley Nelson
Ray Charles, Them That Got
Act 4: Diaspora – Cheryl Wagner
Act 5: Displaced Persons Camp – Lisa Pollak interviews survivors of Hurricane Charley in Florida

Show description: Stories from the Houston Astrodome and New Orleans about survivors of Hurricane Katrina.
Act 1: Let it Snow, Let it Snow, Let it Snow – Jane Feltes
Act 2: No Place Like Dome – Ira Glass
Act 3: Land Grab – Lisa Pollak
Act 4: The Long Way Home – Nick Spitzer
Act 5: Water Bed – Alex Kotlowitz

Act 1: Mothers of Invention – Alex Kotlowitz and Amy Drozdowska-McGuire
Act 2: That Guy – Diane Cook
Act 3: Mall Rat – John Hodgman

Act 1: In the Event of An Emergency – Ira Glass
Act 2: P' Is For Porta-Potty – Sarah Koenig
Act 3:  Friday Night Floodlights – Lisa Pollak

Act 1: Truth, Damn Truth, and Statistics – Alex Blumberg
Act 2: Not Just a Number – Ryan Gist
Act 3: What do we do with these numbers anyway? – Ira Glass

Air date: November 11, 2005
Prologue – Ira Glass
Act 1: One Good Deed – Erin Einhorn
Act 2: The Things That Money Can Buy – Beau O'Reilly

Air date: November 18, 2005
Prologue – Ira Glass
Act 1: Not Just Tourists, Tourists Who Care – Chris Tenove
Act 2: Johnny Get Your Mouse – Amy O'Leary

Act 1: Lab Rugrats – Ira Glass
Act 2: Dreams of Distant Factories – Rachel Louise Snyder
Act 3: Adventures at Poo Corner – David Sedaris

Act 1: Rise – Russell Cobb
Act 2: Fall

Act 1: Twas the Morning After – David Rakoff
Act 2: No Tenenbaum, No Tenenbaum – John Hodgman
Act 3: My So-Called Jesus – Heather O'Neill
Act 4: An Animal Farm Christmas – David Sedaris
Act 5: Christmas at Valley Forge – Sarah Vowell
Act 6: What Would Joseph Do? – Jonathan Goldstein

External links
This American Life's radio archive for 2005

2005
This American Life
This American Life